Dr R. Lakshmanan (born 29 November 1971;Villupuram (Tamil Nadu)) is a politician. He is currently the Member of the legislative assembly representing Villupuram constituency. He was a Member of Parliament, representing Tamil Nadu in the Rajya Sabha  (the upper house of India's Parliament).

He belongs to the Indian Dravida Munnetra Kazhagam (DMK) political party. He defeated Ex-minister C.V.Shanmugam by 14,868 votes in 2021 Tamil Nadu legislative assembly elections.

See also
 List of Rajya Sabha members from Tamil Nadu

References

1971 births
Living people
All India Anna Dravida Munnetra Kazhagam politicians
Lok Sabha members from Tamil Nadu
Rajya Sabha members from Tamil Nadu
People from Viluppuram district
Tamil Nadu MLAs 2021–2026